Raspadskaya may refer to:

 Raspadskaya (company)
 Raspadskaya coal mine, the largest in Russia
 Raspadskaya mine explosion
 FC Shakhta Raspadskaya Mezhdurechensk